Siem is a surname. Notable people with the surname include:

Charlie Siem (born 1986), British violinist
Kjetil Siem (born 1960), Norwegian businessperson, journalist, author and sports official
Kristian Siem (born 1949), Norwegian businessman
Martin Siem (1915–1996), Norwegian businessperson
Mary Alice Siem, American activist
Ole Siem (1882–1979), Norwegian naval officer, businessman and politician
Sasha Siem (born 1984), British-Norwegian singer-songwriter and composer

See also
Security information and event management
Siems